The 1971 Brisbane Rugby League season was the 63rd season of the Brisbane Rugby League premiership. Eight teams from across Brisbane competed for the premiership, which culminated in Fortitude Valley defeating Eastern Suburbs 18–10 in the grand final in front of a record crowd of 37,957. This was Valleys' third consecutive grand final appearance and their second consecutive premiership.

Ladder

Finals 

Source:

References 

1971 in rugby league
1971 in Australian rugby league
Rugby league in Brisbane